The 70th parallel north is a circle of latitude that is 70 degrees north of the Earth's equatorial plane, in the Arctic. It crosses the Atlantic Ocean, Europe, Asia and North America, and passes through some of the southern seas of the Arctic Ocean.

At this latitude the sun is visible for 24 hours, 0 minutes during the summer solstice and Civil Twilight during the winter solstice.

On 21 June, the maximum altitude of the sun is 43.44 degrees and –3.44 degrees on 21 December.

Around the world
Starting at the Prime Meridian and heading eastwards, the parallel 70° north passes through:

{| class="wikitable plainrowheaders"
! scope="col" width="125" | Co-ordinates
! scope="col" | Country, territory or sea
! scope="col" | Notes
|-
| style="background:#b0e0e6;" | 
! scope="row" style="background:#b0e0e6;" | Atlantic Ocean
| style="background:#b0e0e6;" | Norwegian Sea
|-valign="top"
| 
! scope="row" | 
| Troms  – islands of Rebbenesøya, Ringvassøy, Reinøya, Karlsøya and Kågen; mainland; island of Skorpa; mainland Finnmark (mainland)
|-valign="top"
| 
! scope="row" | 
|-
| 
! scope="row" | 
| Finnmark
|-
| style="background:#b0e0e6;" | 
! scope="row" style="background:#b0e0e6;" | Barents Sea
| style="background:#b0e0e6;" |
|-
| 
! scope="row" | 
| Vaygach Island
|-
| style="background:#b0e0e6;" | 
! scope="row" style="background:#b0e0e6;" | Kara Sea
| style="background:#b0e0e6;" |
|-
| 
! scope="row" | 
| Yamal Peninsula
|-
| style="background:#b0e0e6;" | 
! scope="row" style="background:#b0e0e6;" | Gulf of Ob
| style="background:#b0e0e6;" |
|-
| 
! scope="row" | 
|
|-
| style="background:#b0e0e6;" | 
! scope="row" style="background:#b0e0e6;" | East Siberian Sea
| style="background:#b0e0e6;" |
|-
| 
! scope="row" | 
| Ayon Island
|-
| style="background:#b0e0e6;" | 
! scope="row" style="background:#b0e0e6;" | East Siberian Sea
| style="background:#b0e0e6;" |
|-
| 
! scope="row" | 
|
|-
| style="background:#b0e0e6;" | 
! scope="row" style="background:#b0e0e6;" | East Siberian Sea
| style="background:#b0e0e6;" |
|-
| style="background:#b0e0e6;" | 
! scope="row" style="background:#b0e0e6;" | Chukchi Sea
| style="background:#b0e0e6;" |
|-
| 
! scope="row" | 
| Alaska
|-
| style="background:#b0e0e6;" | 
! scope="row" style="background:#b0e0e6;" | Beaufort Sea
| style="background:#b0e0e6;" |
|-
| 
! scope="row" | 
| Northwest Territories  – Tuktoyaktuk Peninsula
|-
| style="background:#b0e0e6;" | 
! scope="row" style="background:#b0e0e6;" | Beaufort Sea
| style="background:#b0e0e6;" |
|-
| 
! scope="row" | 
| Northwest Territories  – Cape Bathurst Peninsula
|-
| style="background:#b0e0e6;" | 
! scope="row" style="background:#b0e0e6;" | Amundsen Gulf
| style="background:#b0e0e6;" |
|-
| 
! scope="row" | 
| Northwest Territories  – Parry Peninsula
|-
| style="background:#b0e0e6;" | 
! scope="row" style="background:#b0e0e6;" | Amundsen Gulf
| style="background:#b0e0e6;" |
|-valign="top"
| 
! scope="row" | 
| On Victoria Island:  – Northwest Territories  – Northwest Territories / Nunavut border  – Northwest Territories  – Northwest Territories / Nunavut border  – Nunavut
|-
| style="background:#b0e0e6;" | 
! scope="row" style="background:#b0e0e6;" | Victoria Strait
| style="background:#b0e0e6;" |
|-
| style="background:#b0e0e6;" | 
! scope="row" style="background:#b0e0e6;" | Larsen Sound
| style="background:#b0e0e6;" | Passing just north of King William Island, Nunavut, 
|-
| style="background:#b0e0e6;" | 
! scope="row" style="background:#b0e0e6;" | James Ross Strait
| style="background:#b0e0e6;" | Passing just north of the Clarence Islands, Nunavut, 
|-
| 
! scope="row" | 
| Boothia Peninsula, Nunavut
|-
| style="background:#b0e0e6;" | 
! scope="row" style="background:#b0e0e6;" | Gulf of Boothia
| style="background:#b0e0e6;" |
|-
| 
! scope="row" | 
| Nunavut  – Crown Prince Frederik Island
|-
| style="background:#b0e0e6;" | 
! scope="row" style="background:#b0e0e6;" | Fury and Hecla Strait
| style="background:#b0e0e6;" |
|-
| 
! scope="row" | 
| Nunavut  – Baffin Island
|-
| style="background:#b0e0e6;" | 
! scope="row" style="background:#b0e0e6;" | Murray Maxwell Bay
| style="background:#b0e0e6;" |
|-
| 
! scope="row" | 
| Nunavut  – Baffin Island
|-
| style="background:#b0e0e6;" | 
! scope="row" style="background:#b0e0e6;" | Steensby Inlet
| style="background:#b0e0e6;" |
|-
| 
! scope="row" | 
| Nunavut  – Baffin Island
|-
| style="background:#b0e0e6;" | 
! scope="row" style="background:#b0e0e6;" | Baffin Bay
| style="background:#b0e0e6;" | Northern limit of the Davis Strait
|-
| 
! scope="row" | 
| Disko Island 
|-
| style="background:#b0e0e6;" | 
! scope="row" style="background:#b0e0e6;" | Sullorsuaq Strait
| style="background:#b0e0e6;" |
|-
| 
! scope="row" | 
| Nuussuaq Peninsula
|-
| style="background:#b0e0e6;" | 
! scope="row" style="background:#b0e0e6;" | Torsukattak Fjord
| style="background:#b0e0e6;" |
|-
| 
! scope="row" | 
| Sermeq Kujalleq
|-
| style="background:#b0e0e6;" | 
! scope="row" style="background:#b0e0e6;" | Gaasefjord
| style="background:#b0e0e6;" |
|-
| 
! scope="row" | 
| Geikie Plateau 
|-valign="top"
| style="background:#b0e0e6;" | 
! scope="row" style="background:#b0e0e6;" | Arctic Ocean
| style="background:#b0e0e6;" | Greenland Sea Norwegian Sea
|}

See also
69th parallel north
71st parallel north

n70
Geography of the Arctic
Borders of Nunavut
Borders of the Northwest Territories